The 2009–10 Siena Saints men's basketball team represented Siena College in the 2009–10 college basketball season. This was head coach Fran McCaffery's fifth season at Siena. The Saints competed in the Metro Atlantic Athletic Conference and played their home games at Times Union Center. They finished the season 27–7, 17–1 in MAAC play to capture the regular season championship. They also won the 2010 MAAC men's basketball tournament for the third consecutive year to earn the conference's automatic bid to the 2010 NCAA Division I men's basketball tournament. They earned a 13 seed in the South Region where they lost to 4 seed and AP #10 Purdue in the first round.

Preseason
In the MAAC preseason poll, released October 27 in Edison, New Jersey, Siena was predicted to finish first in the MAAC.

Roster
Source

Coaching staff

Schedule and results

Source
All times are Eastern

|-
!colspan=9| Regular Season

|-
!colspan=10| 2010 MAAC men's basketball tournament

|-
!colspan=10| 2010 NCAA Division I men's basketball tournament

References

Siena
Siena Saints men's basketball seasons
Siena
Siena Saints men's basketball
Siena Saints men's basketball